is a Japanese actress, singer, and lyricist, and was a popular idol in the 80's. She was cast in numerous films and TV-series since her beginning in 1982 in the leading role of the original TV series Sailorfuku to kikanju. Her first role in a film was in 1983's Toki o Kakeru Shōjo for which she won the award for best newcomer at the 8th Hochi Film Award. She won the award for best actress at the 7th Yokohama Film Festival for Early Spring Story. Numerous other singles and albums have followed.

In the summer of 2007, Harada joined the pop electronica band "pupa" as a vocalist, at the invitation of Yukihiro Takahashi. Other members are Hiroshi Takano, Ren Takada, Hirohisa Horie, Tomohiko Gondo.

Filmography

Films

Television

Discography

Studio albums

Compilation albums

Cover albums

Singles

pupa

Studio albums

References

External links 
 
 JMDb Profile (in Japanese)
 Official Site (in Japanese)
 pupa Official Web Site

1967 births
Living people
Japanese actresses
Japanese women singers
Japanese female idols
People from Nagasaki
Musicians from Nagasaki Prefecture